Kris LaPoint (born 23 January 1953) is an American former professional water skier. During his career he set or tied the world record on seven occasions and won 14 major championships. In 2008 he was inducted into the Water Ski Hall of Fame. He is the older brother of water skier Bob LaPoint.

Biography 
Kris LaPoint was born in Castro Valley, California in 1953, two years prior to his brother Bob. In 1967 at the age of 13 he set the world slalom record at the Tournament of Champions in Mission Bay in San Diego. LaPoint would go on to set or tie seven world records and win 14 major championships.

LaPoint is married to water skier Jennifer Leachman, a former women's slalom world record holder and a 2015 Water Ski Hall of Fame inductee. The couple now work as real estate agents and also run a ski school at their private lake, LaPoint Ski Park, in Orlando, Florida. Following Andy Mapple's death in 2015, LaPoint and Jeff Rogers took over running Mapple Skis. After several years of continuing to promote the Mapple Ski brand, LaPoint decided to found his own brand, LaPoint Skis, which are all hand-made by Kris on site at LaPoint Ski Park.

Achievements

References

1953 births
American water skiers
Living people
Male professional water skiers
People from Castro Valley, California
Sportspeople from Castro Valley, California
People from DeLeon Springs, Florida